The Troubles is a term used within the fictional world represented in the American/Canadian supernatural TV series, Haven, which premiered on July 9, 2010, on Syfy. The series revolves around the resolution of the crises caused when a characters' Troubles are triggered, usually by emotional stress. Troubles include a character's emotions dictating the weather, another's appearance causing others to see their own worst fears, and yet another's fantasies to become real. The Troubled are rarely presented as bad people, merely unfortunate.

William and Mara, Audrey's original incarnation, used the black goo called Aether to create or modify a Trouble. This was the result of Mara being forced to go into the Barn on the day the Hunter Meteor Storm comes to Haven every 27 years, where she will have to go under a new identity.

Background
"The Troubles" is a collective name for the supernatural afflictions that affect certain citizens at critical moments in the life of the town of Haven. Besides the current plague, an outbreak of The Troubles happened in 1983 when the Colorado Kid was killed, when Max Hansen killed the family he was sent to prison for and when other ghastly events happened. Lucy Ripley, a previous incarnation of Audrey, worked with Garland Wuornos and sometimes James Cogan to help resolve the problems caused by The Troubles of 1983. In 1956 Sarah (the incarnation before Lucy) was helped by Dave and Vince Teagues. Lucy was only in Haven for a few months, but apparently when she left, or perhaps disappeared, The Troubles had been contained.

The Haven Herald newspaper has recorded many of these outbreaks in the past. The opening credits sequence displays headlines that show periods of The Troubles that may go as far back as the foundation of the town over 350 years ago. The afflictions often reflect the emotional state of the afflicted: one person's emotions affected the weather and anger brought storms; another whose anger cause electrical discharges.

Some people in the town see The Troubles as a curse from God. The Rev. Ed Driscoll notes, referring to Troubled people, that "Haven is chock full of the ungodly". Other people are more sympathetic to Troubled people.

The Troubled people
Nathan Wuornos cannot feel any pain or other sensations, except for the touch of Audrey Parker, although he had an opportunity to lose his affliction when it was temporarily taken from him by Ian Haskell (Ep.202). The late Chief Garland Wuornos was afflicted with the power to hold Haven together, literally, and when he lost concentration Haven would start to crack. The return of Max Hansen pushed the chief over the edge, no longer able to control the cracking. He held the cracking within himself until he exploded into tiny fragments.(Ep.113)

Below is a list of Haven people known to be Troubled.

Season 1

Season 2

Season 3

Season 4

Season 5

References